The Portland Marriott Downtown Waterfront is a Marriott hotel in downtown Portland, Oregon, United States. The hotel underwent a major renovation in 2015.

The restaurant Truss replaced the Champions Restaurant & Sports Bar in 2012.

See also
 List of Marriott hotels

References

External links
 
 Portland Marriott Downtown Waterfront at Marriott

1980 establishments in Oregon
Hotel buildings completed in 1980
Hotels established in 1980
Hotels in Portland, Oregon
Marriott hotels